The Senior Minister of Punjab is a title sometimes given to a senior Cabinet minister in the Government of Punjab. It implies seniority over all other Ministers in terms of Cabinet rank, but has no specific powers or authority attached to it beyond that of any other Minister. The post is de facto second in Government, although neither of these posts confers the right to succeed a  Chief Minister who becomes incapacitated or resigns, making it somewhat equivalent to a Deputy Prime Minister.

The title is not always in use, so there have sometimes been extended gaps between successive holders of the title.

See also 

 Governor of Punjab, Pakistan
 Chief Minister of Punjab
 Leader of the Opposition of Punjab (Pakistan)
 Speaker of the Provincial Assembly of Punjab
 Provincial Assembly of the Punjab
 Government of Punjab, Pakistan

References 

</ref><ref>
 
 
 

Government of Punjab, Pakistan